Firoz Shah palace complex (Hisar-e-Firoza) is an archaeological complex located in modern-day Hisar, in the Haryana state of India, built by Firoz Shah Tughlaq of the Delhi Sultanate in 1354 AD. It is maintained by the Archaeological Survey of India.

The original town of Hisar was a walled settlement inside of the fort. The Jahaj Kothi Museum, a past residence of George Thomas,sits inside of the Firoz Shah palace complex. The complex contains the Lat ki Masjid mosque and an Ashokan pillar. Gurjari Mahal, another palace nearby, was also built by Firoz Shah for his wife Gurjari in 1356.

History 

The palace, known as Hisar-i-Firuza, is located at a strategic point where the old Delhi Multan Road branches towards Khorasan, a historic region northeast of Iran.

Construction began in 1354 CE, supervised by Firoz Shah. Stone was brought from the hills of Mahendragarh to build the ramparts, which were surrounded by a protective moat. A tank inside the complex was used to refill the moat. The complex was completed in 1356 after two and a half years, and Firoz Shah ordered his courtiers to build their palaces within the walls of the fort.

Restoration work began on the palace in 1924 and has gradually continued since. The complex has been declared a Centrally Protected Monument by the Archaeological Survey of India.

Architecture 

The palace complex consists of a mosque, a Diwan-e-Aam, a palace for the Shah's wife, underground apartments, and a granary. 
The artwork in the fort synthesizes Islamic and Indian architecture, although the mosque is an example of Seljuk architecture. The palace is built of red sandstone.

Gates
The palace complex within the fort had one royal entrance. The protective ramparts around the fort originally had four main gates.

Shahi Darwaza
The Shahi Darwaza, or Royal Gate, entrance  faces east and is still standing. Roughly seven meters tall, the single-story arched gateway has small built-in guard rooms on each side.

Talaqi gate
The Talagi Gate faces west and leads from the palace to the ancient Agroha Mound and to Sirsa. The gate stands across from the main bus station of Hisar. Bastions with slanted narrow niches to shoot arrows at attacking enemy armies still exist.

Nagauri gate
The Nagauri Gate, now gone, led south to Nagaur and on to Jodhpur in Rajasthan via Siwani, Jhumpa Khurd, Rajgarh and Churu. The Bansi Lal government demolished this gate in order to widen the entrance to the market. The British Raj built a two-story clock tower on the site which was demolished as well.

Mori gate
The Mori gate, now gone, faced east. A water channel, now also vanished, entered the fort complex through a hole (Hindi: mori) in the fort bastion to supply water. The gate provided access to Multan in Pakistan, Kandahar in Afghanistan, Mashhad in Iran, and Ashgabat in Turkmenistan. The gate is long gone and unmarked. The current ramp and road link the fort complex and the auto market.

Delhi gate
The Delhi gate, located at current Mehta Nagar here near Shaheed Bhagat Singh Chowk, faced east but is now gone. It led to Delhi on the Delhi Multan Road. It stood near the current Gandhi statue inside the market.

Royal palace

The royal palace is a rectangular three-storied building with two floors above ground and one underground. The king resided here with his entourage. In the past, it had two more floors above the current structure. The ruined pillars of the historical third floor still lie horizontally on the roof of the current structure. They supported a two-story structure of wood and stone.

The palace is built of rubble masonry and lime mortar. The palace building has between one and three rooms on the north, west, and east sides, but it is several rooms deeper on the south side where the bulk of the structure lies. The north and west sides have arched passages built into the fort's bastion, and has no windows. The west and south sides of the structure were renovated by the Archaeological Survey of India and still stand with a flat roof and arched gateway and passages.

On the far northwest side of the complex, there is a watch tower with three stories above ground and one underground, that doubles as a staircase and connects all floors of the palace and serves as a corner passage between the north and west sides of the building. This is the tallest structure in the complex.

The west side structure remains in good condition and still has a roof. It has underground tehkhana  chambers with hammam, or steam baths. There are two doorways on the ground level and three on the second floor which open into the Diwan-e-khas, a central courtyard that served as a private audience hall. The underground apartments were used for sleeping during periods with intense summer heat, as shown by the underground presence of a hammam.

The south side, being the longer side of the rectangular palace complex, has seven doorways on the ground level, and nine doorways on the second story opening into the central rectangular courtyard.

The east and north sides are in ruins and only the remains of the ground floor, with no roof, still exist today.

Stables 
The stables are semi-underground and located between the tehkhana structure to the east of the main royal palace building and the Jahaj Kothi Museum.

Diwan-e-Aam 
To the right of the royal gate is the Diwan-e-Aam, or audience chamber. The Lat ki Masjid is within the courtyard, and the Ashoka pillar, or lat, is in the middle. An L-shaped ablution pool lies in the south corner of the courtyard.

Three rows of 50 red stone pillars line the longer western arm of the L-shaped liwan, which has 18 vaults in the ceiling. Ten pairs of double pillars face east, opening into the courtyard and forming seven doorways. A row of ten single pillars runs down the middle of the hall. A row built into the back wall to the west also has ten pillars. Each chamber in this back wall has three red sandstone niches on the lower half, one outer rectangular niche, and two arched niches inside. The upper portion of the liwan is built with rubble masonry covered with white lime mortar. The flat roof of the longer arm of the liwan is topped with two false domes, one each on the north and south sides.

The shorter north-facing arm of the liwan has three vaulted chambers on three pillars at the front, opening south into the courtyard, and three pillars built into the back wall on the north side.

In the north-west corner of the liwan is a raised Takht-i-shahi or Muluk-khana platform on four smaller red stone pillars, where the throne of the king used to be.  The throne can be reached by five red sandstone steps. Under the platform is a dried-up well. This platform also has a north-west facing qibla wall (towards Kaaba in Mecca) in the mihrab.

Lat ki Masjid 

At the south-east end of the complex is the square Lat ki Masjid, a one-story, one-domed mosque made of red sandstone. Doors pave the way to each direction, with a stone jali (a perforated latticed stone screen) above each door. The roof has stone brackets that can be seen from outside the building. The roof has been altered with the later addition of a brick wall. The ceiling is vaulted and the roof is flat, with a single lime-plastered dome. To the south of the dome lies an above-ground masonry pond with an underground narrow passage connecting it to the basement of the Lat ki Masjid.

Unlike the other structures inside the complex, the mosque was designed using Seljuk architecture. The qibla has been carved inside the prayer hall of the adjacent liwan hall.

Structures 
The mosque is divided into three parts: the central dome, the pillar, and the prayer hall. An L-shaped ablution tank is also located south of the mosque, a couple of feet away. To the southwest, the square mosque building has an exterior staircase to the roof. The mosque also has a narrow underground staircase in its northern wall, which emerges on the south-western edge of the ablution tank in the courtyard.

Hisar Ashokan pillar 

The mosque got its name from Lat, a column located in the northeast part of its courtyard. The Lat was once a part of an Ashokan pillar, one of the rock-cut edicts of Ashoka dating to 250–232 BCE. This has been proven by the inscriptions in Brahmi script on the pillar, deciphered in 1837 by James Prinsep, an archaeologist, philologist, and official of the East India Company. The Ashokan pillar, likely taken from its nearby original location at the Agroha Mound, was cut for ease of transportation. Four of the pieces were rejoined here, and the remaining bottom portions are at the Fatehabad mosque. The four upper portions of the Ashokan pillar here are tapering registers with a finial topped by an iron rod.

Indus Valley civilization mound 
Close to the mosque lies a mound which most likely houses the ruins of an older Indus Valley civilization town.

Bastions
Underground apartments can be found inside the complex in good condition. A passage is embedded in the western wall of the palace leading to the terrace. Archery holes can still be observed in the bastion wall, once surrounded by a water-filled protective ditch, now filled in.

Gurjari Mahal 

Gurjari Mahal is the name of the palace built by Firoz Shah Tughlaq for his mistress Gurjari. The palace is located outside the fort complex to the east and was built as an outlying portion of it.

History 
Gurjari, the mistress of Firoz Shah Tughlaq, was a local resident of Hisar and belonged to a pastoral community. When Firoz asked her to accompany him to the throne at Delhi, she refused. So instead, he built a palace for her in Hisar and built his own palace complex around it.

Architecture 
The palace was built using rubble and mortar.

Structures

Palace 
Only a small portion of the Gurjari Mahal palace main building remains. The palace is built on a rectangular platform and can be approached using a ramp that leads to the upper level. The building has been declared a Centrally Protected Monument by the Archaeological Survey of India. To the north, there were once gardens, but they no longer exist and modern houses took their place. The palace is closed to the public.

Baradari 
The most visible part of what still remains of the palace is the baradari on the upper level, so named for the twelve doorways, three on each side. It was used for social gatherings. Four pillars inside the chamber support the roof.

Underground Hammam 
Three underground apartments are located below the platform. One of them is a tank and is believed to have served as a hammam.

Graves 
On the upper level are a total of nine graves. The last two are brick shrines inside a brick structure that no longer has a roof. All of them date back to the 17th or 18th century Mughal empire era.

Secondary Apartment 
On the upper level, there is a small secondary apartment in the corner of the structure.

Jahaj Kothi Museum

Jahaj Kothi Museum, a later era building that was originally a Jain temple which was later used as residence by George Thomas, is located inside the Firoz Shah palace complex and is maintained by Archaeological Survey of India.

Nearby Haryana Rural Antique Museum is in Gandhi Bhawan, and exhibits the evolution of agriculture and vanishing antiques.

Residence of Superintendent of Livestock Farm
A large British raj era historic building in the complex, to the northeast, was used as a residence for the superintendent of the Government Livestock Farm, Hisar (c. 1809).

See also
 Asigarh Fort
 Pranpir Badshah tomb

References

External links
 Images of Firoz Shah Palace Complex on ASI website

Buildings and structures completed in 1354
Architecture of the Tughlaq dynasty
Buildings and structures in Hisar (city)
Archaeological sites in Hisar district
Tourist attractions in Hisar (city)
Forts in Haryana
Archaeological sites in Haryana
History of Hisar district